Richard Guy Andrews (born April 14, 1966) is a former professional American football linebacker who played in the National Football League (NFL), the Canadian Football League (CFL), and the World League of American Football (WLAF).

Professional career

San Diego Chargers
Andrews was selected by the San Diego Chargers in the tenth round (260th overall) of the 1989 NFL Draft.

Seattle Seahawks
Andrews played in 15 games in the 1990 season.

See also
 Washington Huskies football statistical leaders

References

1966 births
Living people
American football linebackers
Canadian football linebackers
Las Vegas Posse players
Orlando Thunder players
Rhein Fire players
San Diego Chargers players
Scottish Claymores players
Seattle Seahawks players
Washington Huskies football players
Samoan players of American football
Samoan emigrants to the United States
Players of American football from Honolulu
Players of Canadian football from Honolulu